The Edolo Pumped Storage Plant is located along the Oglio River just downstream of Edolo, Brescia Province in the Lombardy region of Italy. Its generators were commissioned between April 1984 and November 1985. Lake Avio was previously completed in 1929 and Lake Benedetto completed in 1940.

Design and operation

The lower reservoir is located in Edolo on the north bank of the Oglio. It was created by a circular dike and stores water for pumping. Of the lower reservoir's  storage capacity,  can be used for pumping. Directly above Lake Avio is Lake Benedetto which supplements Avio with water. Connecting the upper and lower reservoirs is a series of tunnels and pipes. Each penstock reaches the power plant and splits further to supply the eight pump-generators with water. At the power station, each Francis pump-turbine-generator is rated at 125 MW for power generation and 140 MW for pumping. Only seven of the pump-generators can operate at one time.

When energy demand is low and electricity cheap, the plant pumps water from the lower reservoir to the upper. When demand is high, that water, being stored energy, is released back down the same tunnels and pipes to the plant for generation. After being used for generation, the power plant sends the water back to the lower reservoir. New water reserves can also be taken from the Oglio River. This process repeats as needed and allows the plant to serve as a peaking power plant. The plant generates 737 GWh annually but consumes 1,021 GWh pumping. Although it consumes more energy than it creates, pumping occurs at night, when electricity is cheap. This makes to plant economical as it is generating electricity during high demand, more expensive periods. The size of the Avio Dam's catchment area allows it to collect water naturally as well and 219 GWh can be generated from this water alone annually.

See also

Hydroelectricity in Italy
List of pumped-storage hydroelectric power stations

References

Dams completed in 1984
Energy infrastructure completed in 1985
Dams in Italy
Hydroelectric power stations in Italy
Pumped-storage hydroelectric power stations in Italy